Ee Parakkum Thalika is a 2001 Indian Malayalam-language slapstick comedy drama film starring Dileep, Harisree Asokan, Nithya Das and Cochin Haneefa. It was directed by Thaha and written by V. R. Gopalakrishnan, seems to have been inspired by Mouse Hunt. The film was also the debut film of actress Nithya Das. The story follows bus owner Unnikrishnan and his assistant Sundareshan who live and sleep in their bus. It is considered one of the best slapstick comedy movies in Malayalam cinema and was one of the highest grossing Malayalam movie in 2001. The bus known as Thamarakshan Pilla, which is a central figure in the movie eventually developed into a cult figure in Kerala.

Plot
Unnikrishnan owns an old bus, received as compensation for his father Thamarakshan Pillai's road accident, which killed Pillai, who was a chenda master. Now, Unni faces consequences due to the pathetic condition of the bus, named after his father. He sold many valuable things to maintain this bus. His friend and distant relative Sundareshan is his only companion and the bus's cleaner. A mouse had eaten Sundareshan's passport and spoiled his chances of going abroad. Some part of the film's comedy involves Sundareshan running behind the mouse for revenge. A live TV show in which Unni badmouths Circle-Inspector Veerappan Kurup lands him in more trouble when the former commands Unni to leave the city with the bus. Sreedhara Kaimal, an advocate and well-wisher, tries to help Unni with a bank loan to run a mobile kitchen (Thattukada) from his bus. The plot takes a turn when a girl named Basanthi enters the bus as a nomad, but she is actually Gayathri, the daughter of an influential and politically powerful minister R. K. Santhanam in Puducherry. Santhanam forced Gayathri to join politics, which made her leave home. Initially, Gayathri refuses to leave the bus, despite Unni's and Sundareshan's constant efforts. The police trace her and takes her back to Santhanam's custody. Santhanam is making arrangements for her marriage with someone else. Meanwhile, Unni realizes that he could not live without Gayathri. He and Sundareshan secretly enter her house. Unni and his friends plans to take Gayathri, but Santhanam find them inside the almirah. The men of Santhanam starts beating up Unni despite the requests of Gayathri. Terribly wounded Unni refuses to let go of Gayathri and Santhanam realises their true love,letting his daughter go with Unni in his bus.

Cast

Reception
The film received a mostly positive critical reception and was a commercial success. It was the second-highest-grossing Malayalam film of 2001, after Ravanaprabhu.

Soundtrack

Remakes
The film was remade as Sundara Travels in Tamil, as Aaduthu Paaduthu in Telugu and as Dakota Express in Kannada. Many scenes from the movie were used in the Hindi movie Chal Chala Chal.

References

External links 
 

2001 films
2001 romantic comedy-drama films
2000s Malayalam-language films
Films shot in Kerala
Films shot in Kochi
Malayalam films remade in other languages
Films scored by Ouseppachan
Indian romantic comedy-drama films